Deaf Children Australia (DCA) is a national not-for-profit organization that supports deaf and hard-of-hearing children and young people and their families in Australia.

Deaf Children Australia was established in 1862 in response to the needs of a deaf child and her family. The Bluestone Building was built in 1866 and has been the home of support for deaf children and youth ever since.

DCA's mission is to inspire and empower deaf and hard-of-hearing children and young people to reach their full potential.

The head office is located in the Victorian capital of Melbourne.

History 
Deaf Children Australia was established in 1862 in response to the needs of a deaf child and her family.

On 14 February 1859, Mrs. Sarah Lewis wrote a letter to the Melbourne Argus newspaper stating that if there were no education options for her deaf daughter, she would have no choice but to risk the voyage to have her daughter educated in England.

In response to the letter, a deaf man, Frederick J Rose opened the School for the Deaf and Dumb in Peel Street Prahan on 12 November 1860.

Over time the number of pupils increased which resulted in the need for a permanent building with accommodation.

In October 1866, the Bluestone Building at 597 St Kilda road was opened.

In January 1949, the name of the institution was changed from Victorian Deaf and Dumb Institution to Victorian School for Deaf Children.

In February 2003 in response to the growing need for national services, a decision was made to establish Deaf Children Australia as a national entity to advocate for all deaf and hard-of-hearing children across Australia.

Deaf Children Australia offers tours of the building.

Current day services

Helpline 
When families require help with their children from time to time, Deaf Children Australia's helpline assists families of deaf and hard-of-hearing children to make the best choices for their children.

The helpline is a free, anonymous, and confidential service available to families of deaf and hard-of-hearing children and young adults. The helpline can also answer questions from professionals, students, and the public on deafness and hearing impairment. The helpline provides:
 Access to services provided by Deaf Children Australia
 Information and contact details for specialized services that families may need
 Information on deafness and hearing impairment for families, students, professionals, and the public
 Connect parents to support groups

Ph: 1800 645 916
TTY: 1800 508 523

Services 
DCA provides an information service that produces publications and resources as well as a community development service that provides deaf awareness training.

DCA also provides family support workers to help navigate services for parents with a deaf or hard-of-hearing child.

Each semester DCA provides Auslan for families to help families strengthen language learning – families can take their knowledge home and practice together.

Other services include the organizing of recreation events for families and young deaf people.

NDIS Services 
DCA is a registered NDIS service provider. Some of the NDIS services include support coordination, Auslan tutoring, and Youth services for capacity building.

Parent-to-Parent Program 
Members of our Parent Network are available to meet with Trained Support Parents over the phone or through home visits, at Early Intervention Centre playgroups, family POD group picnics, and other activities, or in your community.  Support parents can provide group or one on one support. Anyone can access these services without the need for a referral.

Grants 
Every year Deaf Children Australia accepts submissions for grants from deaf and hearing-impaired people between the ages of 15 and 23. Grants up to $2500 are awarded to assist in implementing activities that improve the lives of deaf people and their families, as well as in recognition of the achievements of those who have overcome the challenges of deafness.

Sign for Work 
Deaf Children Australia also operates Sign for Work, an agency that provides specialist services for not only those who are deaf or hearing impaired but also for those with other disabilities.

Sign for Work assists in finding and applying for employment, as well as training, and referral, and allows free access to office facilities.

See also 
 Frederick J Rose
 Victorian College for the Deaf

References 
Charities and services for children with disabilities, as listed by the Australian Federal Governments Department of Families, Community Services and Indigenous Affairs

Info Exchange Australia

External links 
 Official Website
 Sign for Work

Organizations established in 1860
Health charities in Australia
Non-profit organisations based in Victoria (Australia)
Deafness organizations
Children's charities based in Australia
Deafness charities
Deaf culture in Australia